Ponte Umberto I, also known as Ponte Umberto, is a bridge that links Piazza di Ponte Umberto I to Piazza dei Tribunali in Rome (Italy), in the rioni Ponte and Prati.

Description 
The bridge was designed by architect Angelo Vescovali and built between 1885 and 1895; it was dedicated to Umberto I, King of Italy, who inaugurated the bridge together with his consort Margherita of Savoy. The bridge links the Palace of Justice (popularly known as Palazzaccio) to the area surrounding Piazza Navona.

It is made of three masonry arches covered with travertine and stone of Subiaco and is about 105 m (344 ft) long.

The bridge carries a road with 2 lanes in each direction. Unusually for a road in Italy, this road drives on the left. (Ponte Palatino also has left hand side traffic.) To prevent collisions, there is a raised section with a fence in the middle of the road.

Notes

Bibliography 

Bridges in Rome R. V Ponte
Bridges in Rome R. XXII Prati
Bridges completed in 1895
Road bridges in Italy